Kamel Messaoudi, (30 January 1961; Bouzaréah, Algeria – 10 December 1998; Algiers) was an Algerian Chaabi music performer, highly regarded as one of the greatest musicians in Algeria history.

Biography
He was born in a family of Kabyle origins on January, 30th, 1961, in Bouzaréah at the suburbs of Algiers where he grew up. He started performing chaabi music in 1974 in a students group band.

Discography 

Echamaâ
Ya hassra âalik ya denya
Ya dzair ra7 tab el qalb
Njoum ellil
Kalthoum
Wahd El ghouziel
Hanna
Ech Tsaid
Asm3i ya lbnia
Kifech ana n'habek
Moulat essalef etoui
Mouhel ana n'nssek
Win rayha
Ma n'zid n'khemem
Ouallah ma d'ritek
Mchiti ma chfti wrak
Ma Bqat roudjla
Men houb hadi laghzala
Ya lahbiba ma tabkich
Ya 3rouss -3zziz A3liya- Enta l'habib
Nuit Elyoum N'tfakrek
Rahou Mqaderli
Rouh ya zamen (Samhini)
Ya Mahla ellil
Khaliha ta3mel ma bghat
Al ouadaâ
Nbghi tkouni Mastoura
Nahlem bik

Death
He died in a car crash in December 1998, at the age of 37.

References

1961 births
1998 deaths
Musicians from Algiers
Road incident deaths in Algeria
Algerian composers
20th-century Algerian  male  singers
20th-century composers
Kabyle people